Hichem Mechichi (born January 1974) is a Tunisian politician who served as the Prime Minister of Tunisia, from 2020 to 2021, when he was dismissed by President Kais Saied. He held the post of Minister of the Interior in 2020 before being appointed head of government.

Education
Hichem Mechichi holds a master's degree in law from the faculty of law and political science from Tunis El Manar University, and a master's degree in law, political science and public administration from École nationale d'administration. He is also a former student of the long international cycle, of the Republic promotion (2005–2007) of the National School of Administration of France, the institution paying tribute to him via its website after his appointment as head of government.

Career

He was a member of the National Commission of Investigation on Corruption and Embezzlement, founded in 2011 and chaired by Abdelfattah Amor. In 2014, he was appointed Chief of Staff at the Ministry of Transport, then the same post successively at the ministries of Social Affairs and Public Health.

He was then Director General of the National Agency for the Sanitary and Environmental Control of Products.

Appointed by President Kaïs Saïed as his first adviser in charge of Legal Affairs, on 11 February 2020, he was appointed on the 27 of the same month as Minister of the Interior in the government of Elyes Fakhfakh.

Prime Minister 

On 25 July 2020, in the midst of a political crisis, Saïed appointed him head of government, with the task of forming a government in one month and obtaining the confidence of the Assembly of the Representatives of the People. Later on, he assumed office on 2 September 2020.

He tested positive for COVID-19 during the pandemic on 25 June 2021.

After a series of protests, the Tunisian president dismissed Mechichi as prime minister on 25 July.

References

External links

Living people
1974 births
21st-century Tunisian politicians
COVID-19 pandemic in Tunisia
École nationale d'administration alumni
Independent politicians in Tunisia
Interior ministers of Tunisia
People from Jendouba Governorate
Prime Ministers of Tunisia
Tunis El Manar University alumni